Mathias Lauda (born 30 January 1981) is an Austrian racing driver currently racing for Aston Martin Racing as a factory driver in the FIA World Endurance Championship. He is the son of the late three-time Formula One world champion Niki Lauda and his first wife, Marlene. He has a brother, Lukas, who is currently his manager.

Career

Lauda was born during his father's temporary retirement from F1. Unlike many drivers, who start out in karting, Lauda debuted in 2002 in Formula Nissan 2000. He also drove in two races of German Formula VW and one race of Spanish Formula Three. He moved to World Series Lights in 2003 with the Vergani team, again moving in 2004 to the Euro Formula 3000 Series. Later in 2004 he drove in Formula 3000, completing the full season with the Coloni Motorsport team.

Lauda raced in the 2005 GP2 Series for the Coloni team, alongside former Formula One driver Gianmaria Bruni. He was one of only a few competitors in that initial GP2 season who had a full season of F3000 experience behind them. He also represented A1 Team Austria in the 2005-06 A1 Grand Prix season.

When he had not achieved any major results in single seater racing, Lauda decided to turn his attention to touring cars. From 2006 he competed in the German-based Deutsche Tourenwagen Masters series with Mercedes-Benz, whereas in 2008 and 2009 he dovetailed this with racing in the Speedcar Series.

2012 saw Lauda join Michael Bartels' Vita4One Racing Team in the now-defunct FIA GT1 World Championship, where he finished 12th in the standings with Nikolaus Mayr-Melnhof in a BMW Z4 GT3 (Bartels himself finished 3rd that season). In addition, Lauda was 3rd in the 2012 Spa 24 Hours, again in a Vita4One-entered BMW.

Racing record

Career summary

† Guest driver ineligible to score points

Complete International Formula 3000 results
(key) (Races in bold indicate pole position; races in italics indicate fastest lap.)

Complete GP2 Series results
(key) (Races in bold indicate pole position) (Races in italics indicate fastest lap)

Complete A1 Grand Prix results
(key) (Races in bold indicate pole position) (Races in italics indicate fastest lap)

Complete Deutsche Tourenwagen Masters results
(key) (Races in bold indicate pole position) (Races in italics indicate fastest lap)

† — Retired, but was classified as he completed 90% of the winner's race distance.

Complete Porsche Supercup results
(key) (Races in bold indicate pole position) (Races in italics indicate fastest lap)

‡ Not eligible for points for entering as a guest driver.

Complete GT1 World Championship results

Complete FIA World Endurance Championship results

24 Hours of Le Mans results

Complete WeatherTech SportsCar Championship results
(key) (Races in bold indicate pole position) (Races in italics indicate fastest lap)

Complete European Le Mans Series results
(key) (Races in bold indicate pole position; results in italics indicate fastest lap)

† As Lauda was a guest driver, he was ineligible for points.

NASCAR
(key) (Bold – Pole position awarded by qualifying time. Italics – Pole position earned by points standings or practice time. * – Most laps led.)

Whelen Euro Series - Elite 1

References
Career statistics from driverdb.com. Retrieved on 10 July 2008.

External links

 
 

1981 births
Living people
Sportspeople from Salzburg
Austrian racing drivers
A1 Team Austria drivers
Euroformula Open Championship drivers
Auto GP drivers
International Formula 3000 drivers
GP2 Series drivers
Deutsche Tourenwagen Masters drivers
Speedcar Series drivers
FIA GT1 World Championship drivers
Porsche Supercup drivers
Blancpain Endurance Series drivers
24 Hours of Spa drivers
ADAC GT Masters drivers
NASCAR drivers
24 Hours of Daytona drivers
24 Hours of Le Mans drivers
WeatherTech SportsCar Championship drivers
FIA World Endurance Championship drivers
MRF Challenge Formula 2000 Championship drivers
Lauda family
A1 Grand Prix drivers
Graff Racing drivers
Scuderia Coloni drivers
Mücke Motorsport drivers
Phoenix Racing drivers
Aston Martin Racing drivers
W Racing Team drivers
AF Corse drivers
Mercedes-AMG Motorsport drivers
Audi Sport drivers
Team Rosberg drivers
Nürburgring 24 Hours drivers